Cladochonus is an extinct genus of tabulate coral.

References

Tabulata
Prehistoric Anthozoa genera
Carboniferous cnidarians
Carboniferous invertebrates of North America